Nathanael Justin Oats (born October 13, 1974) is an American basketball coach, currently the head basketball coach at the University of Alabama. Prior to Alabama he was the head coach at the University at Buffalo.

Education and playing career
Oats grew up in Watertown, Wisconsin, where he was a three-year starter on the Maranatha Academy high school basketball team which went 24–0 in his senior year. He stayed in Watertown after high school, playing college basketball at NCCAA Division II/NCAA Division III Maranatha Baptist University. He was an all-conference player and served as a captain of the Crusaders while earning a bachelor’s degree in math education. He subsequently received a Master of Science from the University of Wisconsin-Madison in kinesiology and exercise science.

Coaching career
After finishing his playing career at Maranatha Baptist, Oats became a member of the team's coaching staff in 1997, where he remained until 2000. He then served as an assistant men's basketball coach for the Division-III University of Wisconsin–Whitewater. After the 2002 season, Oats left Wisconsin–Whitewater to become the head basketball coach and a teacher at Romulus High School near Detroit.

Over 11 years at Romulus, Oats accumulated a 222–52 record and reached the semifinals of the state tournament five times. In 2013, Oats led the team to a 27–1 record and a state Class A championship en route to winning multiple coach of the year honors from the local press. He won similar coaching awards in 2005, 2008 and 2009.

Buffalo
While recruiting Romulus guard E. C. Matthews on behalf of Rhode Island in 2013, Bobby Hurley was impressed by Oats' coaching. Shortly thereafter, Hurley was named the head coach at Buffalo and hired Oats as an assistant on his staff.

During his two-year tenure as an assistant, Buffalo had a 42–20 record, won their first Mid-American Conference tournament and made their first ever NCAA tournament appearance. As an assistant at Buffalo, Oats was credited with recruiting Justin Moss, who would go on to win the 2014–15 MAC Player of the Year award.

On April 9, 2015, the same day that Bobby Hurley announced that he would be leaving Buffalo to take the head coaching job at Arizona State, Oats was named the interim head coach at Buffalo. During the days immediately after Hurley announced his departure, Buffalo's athletic director at the time, Danny White, interviewed the team's players, all of whom advocated for Oats becoming the permanent head coach. Also, Hurley told White that he would hire Oats at Arizona State if White didn't hire him permanently. In a 2019 ESPN story on Oats, White recalled, "What stood out is the connections he had with our players. His reputation as a high school coach -- most people I asked said he ran it like a Division I college program. Players had a strong relationship with him." On April 13, Oats was officially given the head coaching job; his base salary was $250,000. The Buffalo roster for his first season as a head coach featured two former Romulus players: Christian Pino and Raheem Johnson.

In Oats' first season as head coach of Buffalo, he led the Bulls to a 3rd place tie in the Mid-American Conference standings. In the MAC Tournament, Buffalo defeated Miami University, Ohio, and then top-seeded Akron to claim the 2016 conference tournament championship. This has been regarded as an impressive feat due to the offseason turnaround that Oats faced. 2015 MAC Player of the Year Justin Moss was dismissed from the University and second-leading scorer Shannon Evans transferred to Arizona State to play for the then-departed Bobby Hurley.  On May 18, 2016, Buffalo Athletic Director Allen Greene announced that the school had agreed on a new five-year contract with Oats.

In Oats' third season, 2017–18, the Bulls began conference play with eight straight wins, the best conference start in team history. The Bulls finished the 2017–18 MAC schedule with a 15–3 record, and Oats was named MAC coach of the year as the Bulls won outright the conference regular season for the first time in team history. The Bulls went on to win the 2018 MAC tournament. On March 8, 2018, Oats signed a contract extension with the University at Buffalo to remain head basketball coach through 2023. Oats' Buffalo Bulls went on to the 2018 NCAA Tournament seeded 13th in the South Region where they convincingly beat the favored 4th seed Arizona Wildcats 89–68.

Oats briefly described his coaching philosophy in the aforementioned 2019 ESPN story, saying, "We did a culture playbook two summers ago and our three main beliefs — core values, we call them — are max effort, continuous growth and selfless love." Since taking over as Buffalo head coach, Oats added what the story called "a blue-collar element to his program that reflects Buffalo itself" — the coaching staff charts what it calls "blue-collar points", defined as any play that contributes to a win but is not recorded in a traditional box score, with examples including but not limited to pass deflections and taking charges. The player with the most such points in a given game receives a construction helmet.

During the 2018-19 regular season, Oats led the Bulls to a 28-3 record and was named 2019 MAC Coach of the Year. On March 14, 2019, Oats signed a contract extension with the University at Buffalo to remain head basketball coach through the 2024 season.

Alabama
On March 27, 2019, athletic director Greg Byrne named Oats the head coach of the Alabama Crimson Tide. His tenure as of 2021 has been viewed as relatively successful, having earned a selection into March Madness two consecutive years. This success led to Oats signing a 3-year contract extension in February 2021 to remain at Alabama through the 2027 season. This extension also raised Oats' annual compensation to $3.225 million.

At the conclusion of the 2020-2021 regular season, and in his second season as head coach, Oats won the SEC Coach of the Year award.  The Tide won the SEC regular-season and tournament titles and made the NCAA tournament for the first time since 2018. They lost the Sweet Sixteen game in overtime to UCLA, 88–78.

Personal life
Oats and his wife Crystal have three daughters, Lexie, Jocie and Brielle. In November 2015, Oats announced on his Facebook page that his wife had an aggressive form of lymphoma and would be undergoing chemotherapy. With his wife's encouragement, he confirmed that he would not be renouncing his coaching duties. Oats is a Christian.

Head coaching record

References

External links
 Buffalo Bulls bio

1974 births
Living people
American men's basketball coaches
American men's basketball players
Basketball coaches from Wisconsin
Basketball players from Wisconsin
Buffalo Bulls men's basketball coaches
College men's basketball head coaches in the United States
High school basketball coaches in the United States
Maranatha Baptist Sabercats men's basketball players
People from Watertown, Wisconsin
Place of birth missing (living people)
Sportspeople from the Milwaukee metropolitan area
Wisconsin–Whitewater Warhawks men's basketball coaches